Osmond Ezinwa (born 22 November 1971) is a former sprinter from Nigeria. Together with Olapade Adeniken, Francis Obikwelu and Davidson Ezinwa he won a silver medal in 4 x 100 metres relay at the 1997 World Championships in Athletics.

He is the identical twin brother of Davidson Ezinwa. Both attended the Christian university Azusa Pacific University.

Osmond Ezinwa tested positive for ephedrine in February 1996.

Personal bests
100 metres - 10.05 (1996)
200 metres - 20.56 (1997)

References

External links

1971 births
Living people
Nigerian male sprinters
Athletes (track and field) at the 1992 Summer Olympics
Athletes (track and field) at the 1996 Summer Olympics
Olympic athletes of Nigeria
Igbo sportspeople
Doping cases in athletics
Nigerian sportspeople in doping cases
Nigerian twins
Azusa Pacific University alumni
Twin sportspeople
World Athletics Championships medalists
Athletes (track and field) at the 1990 Commonwealth Games
Commonwealth Games medallists in athletics
Commonwealth Games silver medallists for Nigeria
African Games bronze medalists for Nigeria
African Games medalists in athletics (track and field)
Identical twins
Athletes (track and field) at the 1995 All-Africa Games
20th-century Nigerian people
21st-century Nigerian people
Medallists at the 1990 Commonwealth Games